Wattlebridge (Irish: Droichead na nGad), sometimes written as Wattle Bridge, is a small hamlet in the south-south-east of County Fermanagh in Northern Ireland. The hamlet is located almost 3½ miles (around 5.5 kilometres) south of the village of Newtownbutler. The hamlet is in a region known unofficially as South Ulster.

Wattlebridge is very close to Fermanagh's boundary with both County Cavan and County Monaghan, the hamlet being just north of the border between Northern Ireland and the Republic of Ireland. The Finn River flows through the hamlet, the river entering Upper Lough Erne a short distance to the west of Wattlebridge. The Wattlebridge Road (the B533), part of the main road between Cavan Town and Lisnaskea, runs via Wattlebridge. This road joins the Cavan Road (often known locally as 'the Concession Road'), part of the A3, at a junction on the southern edge of the hamlet. The A3 becomes the N54 at the townland of Leggykelly in County Cavan, this townland being very close to Wattlebridge. The Cavan Road, or 'the Concession Road', part of the N54 / A3, is the main Cavan Town to Clones road.

Immediately to the east and north-east of Wattlebridge is Drummully, a small district also known as 'the Sixteen Townlands' or 'Coleman's Island'. Drummully is a 'pene-enclave' of County Monaghan, being almost completely surrounded by County Fermanagh. The N54 / A3 passes through Drummully.

Around half a mile to the west of Wattlebridge is Castle Saunderson, a now ruined country house in County Cavan. The 'castle' is located on the Castle Saunderson Demesne and is separated from County Fermanagh by the Finn River. The current Castle Saunderson was largely built in the late 1770s or early 1780s, being expanded and heavily remodeled in the 1830s.

The hamlet straddles two townlands: Edergool, which lies on the northern bank of the Finn River, and Annaghmore Glebe, which lies on the southern bank of the Finn River. Edergool townland is usually known locally as Wattlebridge townland.

Name

The hamlet of Wattlebridge gets its name from the original bridge that spanned the Finn River at this point. This original bridge may have been built in the sixteenth century, and was made of wattle, the bridge being supported by stakes called 'gads'. The current bridge, which is known as Wattle Bridge or Wattlebridge Bridge, is built from stone and probably stands on or very near the site of the original bridge. The Wattlebridge Road, the B533, runs over this bridge.

See also
Death of Samuel Donegan
The Troubles in Newtownbutler

References

Villages in County Fermanagh